Bhokraha may refer to:

Bhokraha, Kosi
Bhokraha, Sagarmatha